Lindsay Smith may refer to:

 Lindsay Smith (ornithologist), Australian naturalist, ornithologist and conservationist
 Lindsay Smith (English footballer) (born 1954), English former footballer
 Lindsay Smith (Australian footballer) (born 1980), former Australian rules footballer
 Lindsay Stuart Smith (1917–1970), Australian botanist, naturalist and public servant
 Lindsay Smith (rugby league) (born 2000), Australian rugby league player

See also
Lindsey J. Smith, member of the Wisconsin State Assembly
Linsey Smith, English cricketer